Farewell Yellow Brick Road is an ongoing tour by English musician Elton John that began in Allentown, Pennsylvania, on September 8, 2018 and will end in Stockholm, Sweden on July 8, 2023. It is intended to be John's final tour and will consist of more than 300 concerts worldwide. The tour's name and its poster reference John's 1973 album Goodbye Yellow Brick Road.

According to Billboard, the tour has grossed $817.9 million from 278 shows through January 2023, making it the highest-grossing tour of all-time.

Background
On 24 January 2018, it was announced that Elton John would be retiring from touring and would soon embark on a three-year tour. The first concert was announced to take place at the PPL Center in Allentown, Pennsylvania on 8 September 2018 followed by an extensive tour of the United States and Canada before moving on to Europe. John cited spending time with his children as the reason for his retirement. Tickets went on sale on 24 February and within hours tickets for the first 60 shows were sold out.

Further North American tours dates were announced on 26 September 2018. John's official website stated: "Salt Lake City, Tacoma, Memphis, Charlotte and Western Canada as well as return dates in Toronto, Philadelphia, Nashville, Cleveland and more". Thirteen days later concerts were revealed for Lille, Paris, Bordeaux and Nîmes, taking place in Summer 2019.

A winter 2020 tour taking place in the United Kingdom and Ireland was announced on 8 November 2018. The original announcement detailed sixteen concerts taking place across England, Scotland, Ireland and Northern Ireland. It was later postponed to 2021, along with the rest of the second European leg and the third North American leg, due to the COVID-19 pandemic. On 15 September 2021, the European leg was postponed to 2023 after John sustained a hip injury. After it was announced in January 2022 that the tour would resume, music director Davey Johnstone stated that the band would wear masks and have tests every two days during the tour. John's first show back took place in New Orleans, Louisiana. He had to temporarily postpone two shows in Dallas after testing positive for COVID-19 and experiencing mild symptoms, and resumed the tour again after making a full recovery. John has tour dates across the UK and Europe for 2022 and 2023, when the tour will wrap up.

At the 27 March 2022 performance in Lincoln, Nebraska, a live hookup was established during the concert and Elton's Oscars charity benefit, which he had not missed in 30 years of hosting, but opted to perform in Lincoln on that date because of the postponements. During the 24 September 2022 performance at Washington, D.C., United States President Joe Biden and First Lady Jill Biden invited John to perform at the White House, where he was presented with the National Humanities Medal.

On 2 December 2022 John announced the final leg of his UK Tour would be headlining Glastonbury festival in 2023 saying "There is no more fitting way to say goodbye to my British fans".

Commercial performance
John announced the farewell tour in January 2018 with arena legs in both North America and Europe, to begin in Pennsylvania in September 2018.  By the end of the first leg of the tour in North American arenas, on 18 March 2019, it had grossed over $125 million and won a Billboard Music Award in the category Top Rock Tour. 

The tour's first three North American legs combined to $268.2 million over 116 shows, while his North American stadium run from July – Nov. 2022 brought in $222.1 million across 33 shows. The tour's 2019 European arena leg grossed $49.9 million, while the 2022 European stadium leg grossed $69.2 million in 2022, resulting in a combined worldwide total of $749.9 million from 5 million tickets sold by November 2022.

In January 2023, the Oceania leg grossed $40.9 million and sold 242,000 tickets. In total, the Australia & NZ shows in 2020 & 2023 have sold 875,000 tickets alone.  By the end of the Oceania stadium leg in January 2023, Billboard reported that the tour has grossed $817.9 million from 278 shows and over 5.3 million tickets sold, making it the highest-grossing tour of all-time after surpassing the previous record-holder, Ed Sheeran's ÷ Tour at $776.2 million. It is the first tour in history to surpass $800 million.

Recordings
On 30 May 2018, it was announced that Elton John had partnered with Peex to personalise the volume for fans' concert experiences plus recording the show to relive.

On 18 May 2022, Disney Original Documentary and Disney+ announced that John's November 2022 shows at Dodger Stadium would be recorded for a documentary titled Goodbye Yellow Brick Road: The Final Elton John Performances And the Years That Made His Legend directed by R.J. Cutler and David Furnish.

Before that, the Dodger Stadium concert on 20 November 2022 was livestreamed on Disney+ as Elton John Live: Farewell from Dodger Stadium. That concert featured guest appearances by Brandi Carlile, Kiki Dee and Dua Lipa.

Set list
The following set list is obtained from the 19 January 2022 show in New Orleans, Louisiana. It is not intended to represent all dates throughout the tour. 

"Pinball Wizard" 
"Bennie and the Jets" 
"Philadelphia Freedom"
"I Guess That's Why They Call It the Blues"
"Border Song"
"Tiny Dancer"
"Have Mercy on the Criminal"
"Rocket Man"
"Take Me to the Pilot"
"Someone Saved My Life Tonight"
"Levon"
"Candle in the Wind"
"Funeral for a Friend/Love Lies Bleeding"
"Burn Down the Mission"
"Sad Songs (Say So Much)"
"Don't Let the Sun Go Down on Me"
"The Bitch Is Back"
"I'm Still Standing"
"Crocodile Rock"
"Saturday Night's Alright for Fighting"
Encore 
"Cold Heart (Pnau remix)" 
"Your Song"
"Goodbye Yellow Brick Road"
"Don't Go Breaking My Heart"

Tour dates

Cancelled shows

Tour band 
Elton John – lead vocals, piano
Davey Johnstone – guitars, backing vocals, music director
Nigel Olsson – drums, backing vocals
Matt Bissonette – bass guitar, backing vocals
John Mahon – percussion, backing vocals
Kim Bullard – keyboards
Ray Cooper – percussion
John Jorgenson – guitar, backing vocals (1 May 2019 – 7 July 2019)

Notes

References

External links

Elton John concert tours
Farewell concert tours
2018 concert tours
2019 concert tours
2020 concert tours
Concert tours postponed due to the COVID-19 pandemic
2022 concert tours
2023 concert tours